Lama Sangha Tenzin was a Buddhist monk. He is thought to have died in the 1500s. His remains are preserved as a mummy, which was discovered in 1975 in Gue, a small town in the Indian state of Himachal Pradesh. Tenzin's tomb was established in the village near the Line of Actual Control (LOC) in the Spiti Valley. His body is the only mummy of a Buddhist monk in India that was naturally mummified (self-mummification). However, the mummy was buried in an earthquake, leading the body to be rediscovered by ITBP personnel in 2004 when they were constructing roads in the area. When found, the body was naturally preserved in a thick glass box without the use of chemical preservatives.

Originally from Tibet, Sangha Tenzin came to Gue for meditation when he was 45-years old.

Folklore 
According to local folklore, Tenzin sacrificed his life for the survival of the village from scorpions. Legend says the mummy is alive and hence became known as "living Buddha". Legend claims that the hair and nails are still growing. The mummy is self-mummified, meaning that it was not artificially preserved or exposed to chemical preservatives, making it a "natural mummy". It belongs to a 15th-century Buddhist monastery.

Some local people worship the mummy as a "living God". It is believed that when Tenzin's soul left his body, a rainbow appeared in the sky and the village was freed from scorpions forever.

References 

Buddhist pilgrimages
Buddhist relics
Mummies